Fit to Be Tied Down may refer to:
"Fit to Be Tied Down" (Conway Twitty song), a song by Conway Twitty from the album Greatest Hits 3
"Fit to Be Tied Down" (Sammy Kershaw song), a song by Sammy Kershaw from the album Politics, Religion and Her